Fascist has been used as a pejorative epithet against a wide range of people, political movements, governments, and institutions since the emergence of fascism in Europe in the 1920s. Political commentators on both the Left and the Right accused their opponents of being fascists, starting in the years before World War II. In 1928, the Communist International labeled their social democratic opponents as social fascists, while the social democrats themselves as well as some parties on the political right accused the Communists of having become fascist under Joseph Stalin's leadership. In light of the Molotov–Ribbentrop Pact, The New York Times declared on 18 September 1939 that "Hitlerism is brown communism, Stalinism is red fascism." In 1944, the anti-fascist and socialist writer George Orwell commented on Tribune that fascism had been rendered almost meaningless by its common use as an insult against various people, and posited that in England fascist had become a synonym for bully.

During the Cold War, the Soviet Union was categorized by its former World War II allies as totalitarian alongside fascist Nazi Germany to convert pre-World War II anti-fascism into post-war anti-communism, and debates around the comparison of Nazism and Stalinism intensified. Both sides in the Cold War also used the epithets fascist and fascism against the other. In the Soviet Union, they were used to describe anti-Soviet activism, and East Germany officially referred to the Berlin Wall as the "Anti-Fascist Protection Wall." Across the Eastern Bloc, the term anti-fascist became synonymous with the Communist state–party line and denoted the struggle against dissenters and the broader Western world. In the United States, early supporters of an aggressive foreign policy and domestic anti-communist measures in the 1940s and 1950s labeled the Soviet Union as fascist, and stated that it posed the same threat as the Axis Powers had posed during World War II. Accusations that the enemy was fascist were used to justify opposition to negotiations and compromise, with the argument that the enemy would always act in a manner similar to Adolf Hitler or Nazi Germany in the 1930s.

After the end of the Cold War, use of fascist as an insult continued across the political spectrum in many countries. Those labeled as fascist by their opponents in the 21st century have included the participants of the Euromaidan in Ukraine, the Ukrainian nationalists,  the government of Croatia, former United States president Donald Trump, the current government of Russia ("Rashism") and supporters of Sebastián Piñera in Chile.

Political use

Eastern European 

The Bolshevik movement and later the Soviet Union made frequent use of the fascist epithet coming from its conflict with the early German and Italian fascist movements. The label was widely used in press and political language to describe the ideological opponents of the Bolsheviks, such as the White movement. Later, from 1928 to the mid-1930s, it was even applied to social democracy, which was called social fascism and even regarded by communist parties as the most dangerous form of fascism for a time. In Germany, the Communist Party of Germany, which had been largely controlled by the Soviet leadership since 1928, used the epithet fascism to describe both the Social Democratic Party (SPD) and the Nazi Party (NSDAP). In Soviet usage, the German Nazis were described as fascists until 1939, when the Molotov–Ribbentrop Pact was signed, after which Nazi–Soviet relations started to be presented positively in Soviet propaganda. Meanwhile, accusations that the leaders of the Soviet Union during the Stalin era acted as red fascists were commonly stated by both left-wing and right-wing critics.

After the German invasion of the Soviet Union in 1941, fascist was used in the USSR to describe virtually any anti-Soviet activity or opinion. In line with the Third Period, fascism was considered the "final phase of crisis of bourgeoisie", which "in fascism sought refuge" from "inherent contradictions of capitalism", and almost every Western capitalist country was fascist, with the Third Reich being just the "most reactionary" one. The international investigation on Katyn massacre was described as "fascist libel" and the Warsaw Uprising as "illegal and organised by fascists." Polish Communist Służba Bezpieczeństwa described Trotskyism, Titoism, and imperialism as "variants of fascism."

This use continued into the Cold War era and the dissolution of the Soviet Union. The official Soviet version of the Hungarian Revolution of 1956 was described as "Fascist, Hitlerite, reactionary and counter-revolutionary hooligans financed by the imperialist West [which] took advantage of the unrest to stage a counter-revolution." Some rank-and-file Soviet soldiers reportedly believed they were being sent to East Berlin to fight German fascists. The Soviet-backed German Democratic Republic's official name for the Berlin Wall was the Anti-Fascist Protection Rampart. After the Warsaw Pact invasion of Czechoslovakia in 1968, Chinese Premier Zhou Enlai denounced the Soviet Union for "fascist politics, great power chauvinism, national egoism and social imperialism", comparing the invasion to the  Vietnam War and the German occupation of Czechoslovakia. During the Barricades in January 1991, which followed the May 1990 "On the Restoration of Independence of the Republic of Latvia" independence declaration of the Republic of Latvia from the Soviet Union, the Communist Party of the Soviet Union declared that "fascism was reborn in Latvia." 

During the Euromaidan demonstrations in January 2014, the Slavic Anti-Fascist Front was created in Crimea by Russian member of parliament Aleksey Zhuravlyov and Crimean Russian Unity party leader and future head of the Republic of Crimea Sergey Aksyonov to oppose "fascist uprising" in Ukraine. After the February 2014 Ukrainian revolution, through the annexation of Crimea by the Russian Federation and the outbreak of the war in Donbass, Russian nationalists and state media used the term. They frequently described the Ukrainian government after Euromaidan as fascist or Nazi, at the same time using antisemitic canards, such as accusing them of "Jewish influence", and stating that they were spreading "gay propaganda", a trope of anti-LGBT activism.

In 2006, the European Court of Human Rights (ECHR) found contrary to the Article 10 (freedom of expression) of the ECHR fining a journalist for calling a right-wing journalist "local neo-fascist", regarding the statement as a value-judgment acceptable in the circumstances.

Russian invasion of Ukraine 

In his 21 February speech, which started the events leading to the 2022 Russian invasion of Ukraine, Russian President Vladimir Putin falsely accused Ukraine of being governed by Neo-Nazis who persecute the ethnic Russian minority and Russian-speaking Ukrainians. Putin's claims about "de-Nazification" have been widely described as absurd. While Ukraine has a far-right fringe, including the neo-Nazi-linked Azov Battalion and Right Sector, experts have described Putin's rhetoric as greatly exaggerating the influence of far-right groups within Ukraine; there is no widespread support for the ideology in the government, military, or electorate. Russian far-right organizations also exist, such as the Russian Imperial Movement, long active in Donbas. Ukrainian president Zelenskyy, who is Jewish, rebuked Putin's allegations, stating that his grandfather had served in the Soviet army fighting against the Nazis. The United States Holocaust Memorial Museum and Yad Vashem condemned the abuse of Holocaust history and the use of comparisons with Nazi ideology for propaganda.

Several Ukrainian politicians, military leader and members of the Ukrainian civil society have also accused the Russian Federation of being a fascist country.

Serbian 
During the 1990s, in the midst of the Yugoslav wars, Serbian media often disseminated inflammatory statements in order to stigmatize and dehumanize adversaries, with Croats being denigrated as "Ustasha" (Croatian fascists). In modern Serbia, Dragan J. Vučićević, editor-in-chief of Serbian Progressive Party's propaganda flagship Informer, holds the belief that the "vast majority of Croatian nation are Ustaše" and thus ''fascists''. The same notion is sometimes drawn through his tabloid's writings. After he was barred from entering to Croatia due to failure of giving prior state notice to visit a WWII Jasenovac memorial site, Aleksandar Vulin, then Serbian defense minister, commented on the blocked visit by saying that modern Croatia is a "follower of Ante Pavelić's fascist ideology." In 2016, Serbian singer Jelena Karleuša tweeted: "If we Serbs were always aligned with occupiers and fascists like Croatia was, we would be in European Union a long time ago." In June 2022, Aleksandar Vučić was prevented from entering Croatia to visit the Jasenovac Memorial Site by Croatian authorities due to him not announcing his visit through official diplomatic channels which is a common practice. As a response to that certain Serbian ministers labeled Andrej Plenković's government as "ustasha government" with some tabloids calling Croatia fascist. Historian Alexander Korb compared these labels with Putin's labels of Ukraine being fascist as a pretext for his invasion of Ukraine. After the EU banned Serbia from importing Russian oil through Croatian Adriatic Pipeline in October 2022, Serbian news station B92 wrote that the sanctions came after: "insisting of ustasha regime from Zagreb and its ustasha prime minister Andrej Plenković". Vulin described the EU as "the club of countries which had their divisions under Stalingrad".

English 
In 1944, the English writer, democratic socialist, and anti-fascist George Orwell wrote about the term's overuse as an epithet, arguing:It will be seen that, as used, the word 'Fascism' is almost entirely meaningless. In conversation, of course, it is used even more wildly than in print. I have heard it applied to farmers, shopkeepers, Social Credit, corporal punishment, fox-hunting, bull-fighting, the 1922 Committee, the 1941 Committee, Kipling, Gandhi, Chiang Kai-Shek, homosexuality, Priestley's broadcasts, Youth Hostels, astrology, women, dogs and I do not know what else. ... [T]he people who recklessly fling the word 'Fascist' in every direction attach at any rate an emotional significance to it. By 'Fascism' they mean, roughly speaking, something cruel, unscrupulous, arrogant, obscurantist, anti-liberal and anti-working-class. Except for the relatively small number of Fascist sympathizers, almost any English person would accept 'bully' as a synonym for 'Fascist'. That is about as near to a definition as this much-abused word has come.

American 
In the United States, fascist is used by both the left-wing and right-wing, and its use in American political discourse is contentious. Several U.S. presidencies have been described as fascistic. In 2004, Samantha Power, a lecturer at the John F. Kennedy School of Government at Harvard University, reflected Orwell's words from 60 years prior when she stated: "Fascism – unlike communism, socialism, capitalism, or conservatism – is a smear word more often used to brand one's foes than it is a descriptor used to shed light on them."

In the American right-wing, fascist is used as an insult to imply that Nazism, and by extension fascism, was a socialist and left-wing ideology, which is contrary to the consensus among scholars of fascism. According to the History News Network, this belief that fascism is left-wing "has become widely accepted conventional wisdom among American conservatives, and has played a significant role in the national discourse." An example of this is conservative columnist Jonah Goldberg's book Liberal Fascism, where modern liberalism and progressivism in the United States are described as the child of fascism. Writing for The Washington Post, historian Ronald J. Granieri stated that this "has become a silver bullet for voices on the right like Dinesh D'Souza and Candace Owens: Not only is the reviled left, embodied in 2020 by figures like [Bernie] Sanders, Alexandria Ocasio-Cortez and Elizabeth Warren, a dangerous descendant of the Nazis, but anyone who opposes it can't possibly have ties to the Nazis' odious ideas. There is only one problem: This argument is untrue." Another example are Republican Representative Marjorie Taylor Greene's numerous statements, such as comparing mask mandates during the COVID-19 pandemic to Nazi Germany and the Holocaust. According to cultural critic Noah Berlatsky writing for NBC News, in an effort to erase leftist victims of Nazi violence, "they've actually inverted the truth, implying that Nazis themselves were leftists", and "are part of a history of far-right disavowal, projection and escalation intended to provide a rationale for retaliation."

In the 1980s, the term was used by leftist critics to describe the presidency of Ronald Reagan. The term was later used in the 2000s to describe the presidency of George W. Bush by its critics and in the late 2010s to describe the candidacy and presidency of Donald Trump. In her 1970 book Beyond Mere Obedience, radical activist and theologian Dorothee Sölle coined the term Christofascist to describe fundamentalist Christians.

In response to multiple authors claiming that the then-presidential candidate Donald Trump was a fascist, a 2016 article for Vox cited five historians who study fascism, including Roger Griffin, author of The Nature of Fascism, who stated that Trump either does not hold and even is opposed to several political viewpoints that are integral to fascism, including viewing violence as an inherent good and an inherent rejection of or opposition to a democratic system. A growing number of scholars have posited that the political style of Trump resembles that of fascist leaders, beginning with his election campaign in 2016, continuing over the course of his presidency as he appeared to court far-right extremists, including his failed efforts to overturn the 2020 United States presidential election results after losing to Joe Biden, and culminating in the 2021 United States Capitol attack. As these events have unfolded, some commentators who had initially resisted applying the label to Trump came out in favor of it, including conservative legal scholar Steven G. Calabresi and conservative commentator Michael Gerson. After the attack on the Capitol, the historian of fascism Robert O. Paxton went so far as to state that Trump is a fascist, despite his earlier objection to using the term in this way. Other historians of fascism such as Richard J. Evans, Griffin, and Stanley Payne continue to disagree that fascism is an appropriate term to describe Trump's politics.

Chilean 
In Chile, the insult facho pobre ("poor fascist" or "low-class fascist") is used against people of perceived working class status with right-leaning views, is the equivalent to class traitor or lumpenproletariat, and it has been the subject of significant analysis, including by figures such as the sociologist Alberto Mayol and political commentator Carlos Peña González. The origin of the insult can possibly be traced back to the massive use in Chile of social networks and their use in political discussions, but was popularized in the aftermath of the 2017 Chilean general election, where right-wing Sebastián Piñera won the presidency with a strong working class voter base. Peña González calls the essence of the insult "the worst of the paternalisms: the belief that ordinary people ... do not know what they want and betray their true interest at the time of choice", while writer Oscar Contardo states that the insult is a sort of "left-wing classism" and implies that "certain ideas can only be defended by the  class."

In 2019, left-wing deputy and future President Gabriel Boric publicly criticized the phrase facho pobre as belonging to an "elitist left", and warned that its use may lead to political isolation.

Korean 

In Korea, the term "fascist" is used in a slightly different sense from other regions, such as Europe and the Americas. In South Korea, the case of showing an ultra-nationalistic view based on Koreans is not referred to as a "fascist", but rather, "Chinilpa" or "Tochak Waegu" tend to be referred to as a "fascist". Therefore, the term "fascist" in Korea has a similar meaning to "colonialist" or "traitor". South Korean liberals and progressives argue that Chinilpa is still a vested interest in the South Korea, criticizing Chinilpa for tarnishing South Korean society with corruption, authoritarianism and defeatism. South Korean liberals refer to "Tochak Waegu" or "fascist" when blaming conservatives.

During the Korea under Japanese rule, conservative elites in Korea cooperated with the Japanese Empire and were even involved in war crimes in the Japanese Empire, including Pacific War. Thus, South Korean liberals, progressives, leftist-nationalists and socialists (including the Juche faction) came to equate "Chinilpa" with "fascist". Even now, some conservative movements in South Korea are related to Chinilpa. Paradoxically, this resulted in anti-Chinilpa-based Korean race ultra-nationalistic supremacy not being criticized as "fascist" in North Korea. (North Korea system is considered similar to Japanese fascism by some scholars, but North Korea is considered to have done better than South Korea in removing Chinilpa.)

See also 
 Chaplinsky v. New Hampshire
 Definitions of fascism
 Godwin's law
 Nazi analogies
 Political insult
 Red-baiting
 Reductio ad Hitlerum

References

External links 

 Masso, Iivi (19 February 2009). "Fašism kui propaganda tööriist". (Fascism as a tool of propaganda). Eesti Päevaleht. Retrieved 16 August 2021.

Article 10 of the European Convention on Human Rights
Fascism
Political slurs for people
Political terminology